Mount Baldy is a summit with an elevation of , in the Tushar Mountains in Beaver County, Utah.

References

Mountains of Utah
Mountains of Beaver County, Utah